This is a partial list of alumni of the Conservatoire de Paris.

Marie-Claire Alain (1926-2013)
Jean-Delphin Alard (1815–1888)
Charles-Valentin Alkan (1813–1888)
Mark Andersen (born 1947)
Maurice André (1933–2012)
Juan Crisóstomo Arriaga (1806–1826)
Jean-Pierre Aumont (1911–2001)
Brigitte Bardot (born 1934)
Léonore Baulac (born 1989)
François Bazin (1816–1878)
George Benjamin (born 1960)
Hector Berlioz (1803–1869)
Henri Betti (1917–2005)
Vanraj Bhatia (1927–2021)
Marcel Bitsch (1921–2011)
Georges Bizet (1838–1875)
Adolphe Blanc (1828–1885)
Serge Blanc (1923–2013)
Pierre Bleuse (born 1977)
Nicolas Bochsa (1789–1856)
Paul Bonneau (1918–1995)
Daniel Bonade (1896–1976)
Marc Bonnehée (1828–1886)
Joseph Bonnet (1884–1944)
Louis-Albert Bourgault-Ducoudray (1840–1910)
Jules Boucherit (1877–1962)
Nadia Boulanger (1887–1979)
Pierre Boulez (1925-2016)
Edvard Hagerup Bull (1922–2012)
Ammiel Bushakevitz (born 1986)
Caravelli (born 1930)
Édith Canat de Chizy (born 1950)
Eugène Caron (1834–1903) 
Yvan Cassar (born 1966)
Jean-Pascal Chaigne (born 1977)
Angelin Chang
Gustave Charpentier (1860–1956)
Marthe Chenal (1881–1947)
Michel Chion (born 1947)
Richard Clayderman (born 1953)
Pierre Cochereau (1924–1984)
Serge Collot (1923–2015)
Philip Corner (born 1933)
Alfred Cortot (1877–1962)
Régine Crespin (1927-2007)
José Cubiles (1894-1971)
Jean Daetwyler (1907–1994)
Marc-André Dalbavie (born 1961)
Adolphe Danhauser (1835-1896)
Claude Debussy (1862–1918)
Jacques Delacôte (born 1942)
Charles Delioux (1825–1915)
Marc Delmas (1885-1931)
François Delsarte  (1811–1871)
Jeanne Demessieux (1921–1968)
Pierre Dervaux (1917–1992)
David Devriès (1881–1936)
Paul Doguereau (1908–2000)
Désiré Dondeyne (born 1936)
Julie Dorus (1805–1896)
Louis Dorus (1812–1896)
Théodore Dubois (1837–1924)
Denis Dufour (born 1953)
Paul Dukas (1865–1935)
Christophe Dumaux (born 1979)
Marcel Dupré (1886–1971)
Frédéric Durieux (born 1959)
Maurice Duruflé (1902–1986)
Henri Dutilleux (1916–2013)
George Enescu (1881–1955)
Ulvi Cemal Erkin (1906–1972)
Verda Erman (1944-2014) 
Cornélie Falcon (1814–1897)
André Fleury (1903–1995)
Louis Fleury (1878–1926)
Friedrich von Flotow (1812–1883)
Jean Françaix (1912–1997)
César Franck (1822–1890)
Gertrude Franklin (1858-1913)
Charles Friant (1890–1947)
Yvonne Gall (1885–1972)
Louis Garrel (born 1983)
Odette Gartenlaub (1922-2014)
Philippe Gaubert (1879–1941)
Allain Gaussin (born 1943)
Koharik Gazarossian (1907-1967)
Simon Ghraichy (born 1985)
Claire Gibault (born 1945)
Benjamin Godard (1849–1895)
Peter-Lukas Graf (born 1929)
Hélène Grimaud (born 1969) 
Gérard Grisey (1946–1998)
Gabriel Grovlez (1879–1944)
Jean-Jacques Grunenwald (1911–1982)
Jean Guillou (1930–2019)
Reynaldo Hahn (1874–1947)
Naji Hakim (born 1955)
Jacques Halévy (1799–1862)
Harry Halbreich (born 1931)
François-Louis Henry (1786–1855)
Henri Herz (1803–1888)
Arthur Honegger (1892–1955)
Philippe Honoré (Professor of Violin, born 1967)
Jacques Ibert (1890–1962)
Georges Jacobi (1840-1906)
Bernard Jean (born 1948)
Louis Jullien (1812–1860)
David Kadouch (born 1985)
Charles Koechlin (1867–1950)
Katia Labèque (born 1950)
Marielle Labèque (born 1952)
Édouard Lalo (1823–1892)
Jean Langlais (1907–1991)
Olivier Latry (born 1962)
Ramon Lazkano (born 1968)
Maurice Le Boucher (1882–1964)
Raymond Lefèvre (1929–2008)
Henri Legay (1920–1992)
Fabien Lévy (born 1968)
Gaston Litaize (1909–1991)
Louiguy (1916–1991)
Sarah Louvion (born 1976)
Alexandre Luigini (1850–1906)
Ma Sicong (1912-1987) 
Eileen Malone (1906-1999)
Edward MacDowell (1860-1908)
Bruno Mantovani (born 1974)
Pierrette Mari (born 1929)
Bérénice Marlohe (born 1979)
Neville Marriner (1924–2016)
Martin Marsick (1847–1924)
Jean Martinon (1910–1976)
Georges Mathias (1826–1910)
Michael Matthes
Paul Mauriat (1925–2006)
Paule Maurice (1910–1967)
Jules Mazellier (1859–1979)
Alcide Menetrier (born 2000)
Kristin Merscher (born 1961)
Olivier Messiaen (1908–1992)
Darius Milhaud (1892–1974)
Jacques-Louis Monod (born 1927)
Pierre Monteux (1875–1964)
Jean Morère (1836–1887)
Marcel Moyse (1889–1984)
Clarence Myerscough (1930–2000)
Ginette Neveu (1919–1949)
Panagopoulos Nicolas (born 1954)
Henri O'Kelly (1859–1938)
Clairemarie Osta (born 1970)
Cécile Ousset (born 1936)
Emmanuel Pahud (born 1970)
Jean-François Paillard (1928-2013)
Vincent Peirani (born 1980)
Gérard Pesson (born 1958)
Patricia Petibon (born 1970)
Jean-Louis Petit (born 1937)
Isidor Philipp (1863–1958)
Bruno Philippe (born 1993)
Gabriel Pierné (1863–1937)
Auguste Pilati (1810–1877)
Émile Poillot (1886–1948)
Pierre Pincemaille (1956–2018)
Horace Poussard (1829–1898)
Marie Prestat (1862–1933)
Georges Prêtre (born 1924)
André Previn (1929–2019)
Roland Pröll (born 1949)
Manuel Quiroga (1892-1961)
Jean-Pierre Rampal (1922-2000)
Maurice Ravel (1875–1937)
Albert Renaud (1855–1924)
Gabrielle Réjane (1856–1920)
Achille Rivarde (1865–1940)
Paul Rougnon (1846–1934)
Mathilde Saïman (1891–1940)
Camille Saint-Saëns (1835–1921)
Pierre Sancan (1916–2008)
Erik Satie (1866-1925)
Pablo de Sarasate (1844–1908)
Jean-Marc Savelli (born 1955)
Florent Schmitt (1870–1958)
Marthe Servine (19__-1972)
Sylvia Soublette (1924-2020)
Marc Soustrot (born 1949)
James Strauss (born 1974)
Paul Taffanel (1844—1908)
Germaine Tailleferre (1892–1983)
Anja Thauer (1945-1973)
Jacques Thibaud (1880–1953)
Paul Tortelier (1914–1990)
Charles Tournemire (1870–1939)
Guy Touvron (1967–1973)
Hélène Tysman (born 1982)
Tamara Vakhvakhishvili (1893-1976)
Monir Vakili (born 1923)
Grace Vamos (1898-1992)
Pascal Verrot (born 1959)
 Johann Vexo (born 1978)
Louis Vierne (1870–1937)
Éric Vigner (born 1960)
Ricardo Viñes (1876–1943)
Igor Wakhévitch (born 1948)
François Weigel (born 1964)
Aimee Wiele (1907-1991)
Henryk Wieniawski (1835–1880)
Xian Xinghai (1905–1945)

See also
List of music students by teacher
Music education

References

 
Conservatoire de Paris, List of former students
Conservatoire de Paris, List of former students
Lists of musicians